Wonder Women is an Indian English-language film directed by Anjali Menon for producers Ronnie Screwvala and Ashi Dua Sara, starring Nadiya Moidu, Nithya Menen, Parvathy Thiruvothu, Padmapriya Janakiraman, Sayanora Philip, Archana Padmini and Amruta Subhash in the lead roles. Though the film was made in English language, it has the touches of Malayalam, Tamil, Telugu, Kannada, Hindi, and Marathi languages.

The trailer of the film was released on 3 November and started streaming on 18 November through SonyLIV.

Plot 
Five pregnant ladies come to stay at 'Sumana', a prenatal class conducted by Nandita (Nadiya Moidu). She calls them as ‘Real superheroes’ as they get ready to embrace motherhood. In their quest to know the new life, they discover their true identity and the answers to their deep-rooted problems.

Cast 
Nadiya Moidu as Nandita
Nithya Menen as Nora Joseph
Parvathy Thiruvothu as Mini
Padmapriya Janakiraman as Veni
Sayanora Philip as Saya
Archana Padmini as Gracy
Amruta Subhash as Jaya
Radha Gomaty as Veni's mother in law
Nilambur Ayisha as Mini's grandmother
Dr. Haris Saleem as Sanjay, Nora's partner
Srikanth K. Vijayan as Bala, Veni's partner
Praveen Premnath as Jojo, Saya's partner
Ajayan Adat as Kannan, Gracy's partner
Sandesh Kulkarni as Umesh, Jaya's partner
Remya Sarvada Das as yoga instructor
P. V. Aakash Mahesh as Adi
Jamalayisha Bava as Adi's mother
Vishakh Nair as Doctor
Nadur Akash as Veni's father in law

Production
The makers announced the film with a peculiar campaign where the star cast took to their social media handles with a picture of a positive pregnancy kit, followed by a conversational video reel, in character, where they spoke about various facets of pregnancy.

Reception

Critical reception
The film received mixed response from critics and audience. Janani K of India Today stated that the film is an ode to sisterhood. Nandini Ramnath of Scroll.in stated that the film is tribute to female solidarity. Anna M. M. Vetticad called the writing "superficial" and wrote, "Wonder Women also belongs to that category of films coming from Malayalam filmmakers who seem to believe that cosmopolitanism and coolth can be conveyed only by English and Hindi, never by Malayalam."

References

External links
 

2022 films
Indian drama films